Hugo Higueras (born 22 September 1910, date of death unknown) was a Peruvian fencer. He competed in the individual foil event at the 1948 Summer Olympics.

References

External links
 

Year of death missing
Peruvian male foil fencers
Olympic fencers of Peru
Fencers at the 1948 Summer Olympics
1910 births
20th-century Peruvian people